Fabrice Piemontesi (born 16 August 1983) is an Italian professional road bicycle racer.

Palmarès

2004
1st Trofeo Edil C
2009
 9th Giro della Romagna
2010
2nd Gran Premio Nobili Rubinetterie – Coppa Papà Carlo

External links

1983 births
Living people
Italian male cyclists
People from Sion, Switzerland
Sportspeople from Valais
Sportspeople from the Province of Verbano-Cusio-Ossola
Cyclists from Piedmont